The Tides Return Forever is the fifteenth studio album by the German rock band Eloy, released in 1994. With this album, Klaus-Peter Matziol returned as a full member of the band.

Track listing
Music by Frank Bornemann / Michael Gerlach. Lyrics by Frank Bornemann.
 "The Day of Crimson Skies"  – 5:02
 "Fatal Illusions"  – 9:22
 "Childhood Memories"  – 6:22
 "Generation of Innocence"  – 6:10
 "The Tides Return Forever"  – 6:40
 "The Last in Line"  – 4:01
 "Company of Angels"  – 9:45

Personnel

Eloy
Frank Bornemann: guitar, lead vocals
Michael Gerlach: keyboards, backing vocals
Klaus-Peter Matziol: bass guitar

Guest musicians
Nico Baretta: drums (all tracks)
Jocelyn B. Smith: lead vocals (5)
Miriam Stockley: lead vocals (7)
Peter Beckett & Tom Jackson: lead vocals (5-7)
Susanne Schätzle & Bettina Lux: backing vocals (6)
Steve Mann: acoustic guitar solo (5)
Ralf Vornberger: acoustic guitar (5)
Dirk Michaelis: acoustic guitar (3)

Technical personnel
Produced by Frank Bornemann

1994 albums
Eloy (band) albums